Amplicincia pallida is a moth of the subfamily Arctiinae. It was described by Arthur Gardiner Butler in 1878. It is found in Jamaica.

References

Moths described in 1878
Lithosiini
Moths of the Caribbean